The Nawabs of Bhopal were the Muslim rulers of Bhopal, now part of Madhya Pradesh, India. The nawabs first ruled under the Mughal Empire from 1707 to 1737, under the Maratha Empire from 1737 to 1818, then under British rule from 1818 to 1947, and independently thereafter until it was acceded to the Union of India in 1949. The female nawabs of Bhopal held the title Nawab Begum of Bhopal.

List of rulers of Bhopal

Nawabs of Bhopal

 
 Nawab Dost Muhammad Khan (circa 1672-1728); founded the state of Bhopal in 1707 and ruled it until 1728. He also founded the city of Islamnagar, founded by Dost Mohammad Khan in 1716 and early 1720s.
 Nawab Sultan Muhammad  (1720-?); ruled from 1728 to 1742.
 Nawab Yar Muhammad Khan (1709-1742), Regent of Bhopal; 1728-1742.
 Nawab Faiz Mohammad Khan (1731-1777); ruled from 1742 to 1777.
 Nawab Hayat Muhammad Khan (1736-1807); ruled from 1777 to 1807. 
 Nawab Ghaus Muhammad Khan (1767-1826); ruled from 1807 to 1826. 
 Nawab Muiz Muhammad Khan (circa 1795-1869); ruled from 1826 to 1837. He was succeeded by his wife Qudsia Begum.
 Nawab Jahangir Muhammad Khan (1816-1844); ruled from 1837 to 1844. He was succeeded by his daughter Shah Jahan Begum.

Nawab Begums of Bhopal

 Qudsia Begum, (ruler from 1819 to 1837) - In 1819, 18-year-old Qudsia Begum (also known as Gohar Begum) took over the reins after the assassination of her husband. She was the first female ruler of Bhopal. She declared that her 2-year old daughter Sikander will follow her as the ruler. None of the male family members dared to challenge her decision. She ruled till 1837 when she died having adequately prepared her daughter for ruling the state. She was succeeded by her son-in-law Jahangir Muhammad Khan who married her daughter Sikandar Begum.
 Nawab Sikandar Begum (ruled from 1860 to 1868)
 Begum Sultan Shah Jehan (ruled from 1844 to 1860 and 1868 to 1901) - Shahjahan was the only surviving child of Sikandar Begum, sometime Nawab of Bhopal by correct title, and her husband Jahangir Mohammed Khan. She was recognised as ruler of Bhopal in 1844 at the age of six; her mother wielded power as regent during her minority. However, in 1860, her mother Sikandar Begum was recognised by the British as ruler of Bhopal in her own right, and Shahjahan was set aside. During her reign the first postage stamps of the Bhopal state were issued. In 1876 and 1878 there were issues of half and quarter anna stamps. Those of 1876 have text "HH Nawab Shahjahan Begam" in an octagonal frame; the 1878 stamps the same text in a round frame and the Urdu form of the Begum's title. The last stamps bearing her name were issued in 1902 with inscription: "H.H. Nawab Sultan Jahan Begam".
 Begum Kaikhusrau Jahan (ruled from 1901 to 1926, died 1930)

Titular rulers

 Al-Haj Nawab Sir Hafiz Muhammad Hamidullah Khan Bahadur GCSI, GCIE, CVO (1894-1960); ruled from 1926-1947, serving as nominal ruler to his death in 1960. Last of the sovereign Nawabs of Bhopal.
Sajida Sultan, Begum of Bhopal (1915 - 1995); ruled from (1960-1971), titular Begum of Bhopal until 1971 when India abolished royal entitlements through the 26th Amendment to the Constitution of India.

Family tree

The family tree of the ruling dynasty is given below:

Sardar Khair Muhammad Khan Orakzai of the Mirazi Khel branch of the Orakzais of Tirah
Mir Quli Khan siddiqui
 Mir Hazar Khan siddiqui
 Sardar Muhammad Jalal Khan Lohari (d. 1717)
 Sardar Muhammad Yar Khan
 Sardar Dilawar 'Ali Khan
 Sardar Iman 'Ali Khan
 Sardar Hasan 'Ali Khan
 Sardar Mansur Khan
 Baqi Muhammad Khan (d. 1860s)
 Nawab Ahmad 'Ali Khan Bahadur, Nawab Consort of Bhopal (1854-1902) m. 1874.  X. Nawab Sultan Kaikhusrau Jahan Begum Sahiba, Nawab Begum of Dar ul-Iqbal-i-Bhopal GCSI, GCIE, CI, GBE (1858-1930; r. 1901-1926, when she abdicated in favour of her son)
  XI. Hajji Hafiz Muhammad Hamidu'llah Khan Bahadur, Nawab of Dar ul-Iqbal-i-Bhopal GCSI, GCIE, CVO (1894-1960; r. 1926-1949; titular Nawab and family head: 1949-1960)
  XII. Mehr-i-Taj Sajida Sultan Begum Sahiba, Nawab Begum of Dar ul-Iqbal-i-Bhopal (1915-1995; titular Nawab Begum and family head: 1960-1995 (legal status and recognition as Nawab Begum revoked December 1971). m. Nawab Muhammad Iftikhar 'Ali Khan Bahadur, Nawab of Pataudi (1910-1952)
 XIII. Sahela Sultan, titular Nawab Begum of Bhopal (1940 - 2020), Head of Royal House of Bhopal, m. Bashir Yar Jung and Muhammad Mansur 'Ali Khan Bahadur, Nawab of Pataudi,  (1941-2011; titular Nawab of Pataudi: 1952-2011 (derecognised 1971); 
 XIV.  Muhammad Saif Ali Khan, Nawab of Pataudi (b. 1970; titular Nawab of Pataudi: 2011–present
 Sahibzada Muhammad Ibrahim 'Ali Khan (b. 2001.)
 Sardar Khan Muhammad Khan
 Sardar Jan Muhammad Khan
 Sardar Nur Muhammad Khan (d. 1714)
Sardar Aqil Muhammad Khan (d. 1742) Wazir to Nawab Dost Muhammad Khan. Joint Nawab Regent of Bhopal: 1728-1742
  I. Dost Muhammad Khan Bahadur, Nawab of Dar ul-Iqbal-i-Bhopal (1672-1728; Nawab of Bhopal: 1723; r. 1723-1728)
Nawab Yar Muhammad Khan Bahadur, Nawab Regent of Bhopal (1709-1742). Joint Nawab Regent of Bhopal: 1728-1742
 III. Faiz Muhammad Khan Bahadur, Nawab of Dar ul-Iqbal-i-Bhopal (1731-1777; r. 1742-1777)
  IV. Hayat Muhammad Khan Bahadur, Nawab of Dar ul-Iqbal-i-Bhopal (1736-1807; r. 1777-1807)
  V. Ghaus Muhammad Khan Bahadur, Nawab of Dar ul-Iqbal-i-Bhopal (1767-1826; r. 1807-1826)
 VI. Muiz Muhammad Khan Bahadur, Nawab of Dar ul-Iqbal-i-Bhopal (c. 1795?-1869; r. 1826-1837)
 Nawab Begum Qudsia Begum Sahiba, Nawab Begum Regent of Bhopal CI (1801-1881; Nawab Begum Regent of Bhopal: 1819-1837). m. Nawab Nasir Muhammad Khan Bahadur, Nawab Regent of Bhopal (1793-1819; Regent of Bhopal: 1816-1819) and had issue - see below.
 II. Sultan Muhammad Khan Bahadur, Nawab of Dar ul-Iqbal-i-Bhopal (1720-after 1742; r. 1728-1742)
 Nawabzada Fazil Muhammad Khan
 Mian Sharif Muhammad Khan (d. 1787)
 Nawab Wazir Muhammad Khan Bahadur, Nawab Regent of Dar ul-Iqbal-i-Bhopal (1766-1816; Regent of Bhopal: 1808-1816)
Mian Amir Muhammad Khan (d. 1854)
  VII. Jahangir Muhammad Khan Bahadur, Nawab of Dar ul-Iqbal-i-Bhopal (1816-1844; r. 1837-1844). m.  VIII. Sikander Begum Sahiba, Nawab Begum of Dar ul-Iqbal-i-Bhopal (1817-1868; Nawab Begum Regent of Bhopal: 1847-1860; Nawab Begum of Bhopal: 1860-1868)
  IX. Nawab Sultan Shah Jahan Begum Sahiba, Nawab Begum of Dar ul-Iqbal-i-Bhopal GCSI, CI (1838-1901; r. 1844-1860, 1868-1901) 
  X. Nawab Sultan Kaikhusrau Jahan Begum Sahiba, Nawab Begum of Dar ul-Iqbal-i-Bhopal GCSI, GCIE, CI, GBE (1858-1930; r. 1901-1926, when she abdicated in favour of her son) m. Nawab Ahmad 'Ali Khan Bahadur, Nawab Consort of Bhopal (1854-1902) - see above
 Nawab Nasir Muhammad Khan Bahadur, Nawab Regent of Bhopal (1793-1819; Regent of Bhopal: 1816-1819). m. Nawab Begum Qudsia Begum Sahiba, Nawab Begum Regent of Bhopal (1801-1881; Nawab Begum Regent of Bhopal: 1819-1837). and had issue:
  VIII. Sikander Begum Sahiba, Nawab Begum of Dar ul-Iqbal-i-Bhopal GCSI (1817-1868; Nawab Begum Regent of Bhopal: 1847-1860; Nawab Begum of Bhopal: 1860-1868)

See also

 List of Sunni Muslim dynasties
 Pathans of Madhya Pradesh

References

External links
 The Begums of Bhopal

 
Bhopal
People from Bhopal
History of Bhopal
1707 establishments in India